Vine City is an at-grade train station in Atlanta, Georgia, serving the Blue and Green lines of the Metropolitan Atlanta Rapid Transit Authority (MARTA) rail system. It is one of only two stations served by the Green and Blue lines at all times.

Vine City primarily provides access to the Vine City area, overflow service to Mercedes-Benz Stadium, as well as access to the Atlanta University Center. It also features 27 parking spaces in a small on-site lot. Due to its dense location, it is not directly served with bus service; however, bus service is provided along the streets surrounding the station and at the nearby Hamilton E. Holmes station or Five Points station.

As of 2013, Vine City only had a weekday average of 821 entries, making it the least busy station.

Station layout

History
Vine City was opened on December 22, 1979, making it part of the second oldest section of MARTA, as every other west station (denoted with a "W" in their station code) was opened on the same day, including the East-West section of Five Points. Although it is now part of the Green and Blue Lines, both were originally one line, The East-West Line. It was considered one line from its launch until 2006 when the West branch and the Proctor Creek branch were redesignated as the East-West Line (the current Blue Line) and the Proctor Creek Line (the current Green Line). 3 years later in 2009, MARTA switched over the color system, giving us the modern day Green and Blue Lines.

The area it serves, Vine City, was mostly industrial in the early 20th century, being just south of Atlanta's largest power plant, the Davis Street Plant. As of 2015, some of the areas west of Northside Drive are largely abandoned and primed for redevelopment.

Bus Routes
The station is served by the following MARTA bus routes:
 Route 94 - Northside Drive

Nearby landmarks & popular destinations
Mercedes-Benz Stadium
Morris Brown College
Herndon Stadium
Clark Atlanta University
Spelman College
Morehouse College

References

External links
Station Overview, including video tour3
Electric Avenue entrance from Google Maps Street View
MARTA Guide

Blue Line (MARTA)
Green Line (MARTA)
Metropolitan Atlanta Rapid Transit Authority stations
Railway stations in the United States opened in 1979
Railway stations in Atlanta
1979 establishments in Georgia (U.S. state)
English Avenue and Vine City